Lawrence Johnson (born September 11, 1957) is a former American football cornerback who played nine seasons in the National Football League for the Cleveland Browns and the Buffalo Bills.  He played college football at the University of Wisconsin. He has a wife Bernetta Johnson, a daughter Labreya Johnson, and a son Lawrence L.O. Johnson. 

1957 births
Living people
American football cornerbacks
Buffalo Bills players
Cleveland Browns players
Wisconsin Badgers football players
Players of American football from Gary, Indiana